Steven Anton Bergquist (born September 7, 1979) is an American politician and educator serving as a member of the Washington House of Representatives from the 11th Legislative District.

Education 
Bergquist earned a Bachelor of Arts degree from the University of Washington, where he double-majored in political science and history. He then earned a Master of Arts in Teaching and social studies from Western Washington University.

Career 
After earning his master's degree, Bergquist worked as a teacher in Renton, Washington. Bergquist also operated a small business. He was first elected in to the Washington House of Representatives in 2012, succeeding Bob Hasegawa.

Personal life 
Bergquist and his wife, Avanti, have two children. Bergquist's wife works as a physician.

References

Democratic Party members of the Washington House of Representatives
Living people
1979 births
21st-century American politicians
People from Renton, Washington